Edinburgh Rugby Stadium, known as the DAM Health Stadium for sponsorship reasons, is a rugby stadium in Edinburgh, Scotland. It is the home of Edinburgh Rugby. 
The stadium is located next to Murrayfield Stadium, in the Murrayfield area of the city. It has a capacity of 7,800, and was completed on 16 February 2021.

Structure and facilities
The stadium consists of four stands.

North Stand: 2,047 (Main stand)
East Stand: 1,480
South Stand: 2,704
West Stand: 1,564

There is seating for the disabled in all areas of the ground with a dedicated disabled terrace in the North Stand.

Opening
Completed during the Covid-19 period where no fans could attend matches, Edinburgh played their first match at the stadium on 11 September 2021, facing Premiership Rugby side Newcastle Falcons in a pre-season friendly.

Transport

Buses
The stadium is served by Lothian Buses.

Rail

Tram
Murrayfield Stadium tram stop is located adjacent to Murrayfield Stadium entrance turnstiles on Roseburn Street.

References

External links
Edinburgh Rugby

Edinburgh Rugby
Edinburgh Trams stops
Rugby union in Edinburgh
Rugby union stadiums in Scotland
Sports venues in Edinburgh
2021 establishments in Scotland
Sports venues completed in 2021